Perrin is an unincorporated community in Clinton County, in the U.S. state of Missouri.

History
A post office called Perrin was established in 1873, and remained in operation until 1953. Besides the post office, Perrin had a railroad depot and a schoolhouse.

References

Unincorporated communities in Clinton County, Missouri
Unincorporated communities in Missouri